The Ebenezer Beesley House in Salt Lake City, Utah, is a 2-story adobe brick and stucco Vernacular house constructed in the 19th century. The house is one of only a few I-form adobe structures remaining in the city, and it includes minimal ornamentation. The house was added to the National Register of Historic Places in 1979.

Ebenezer Beesley (14 December 1840 – 21 March 1906) was a pioneer who immigrated to Utah from England in 1859, joining George Rowley's Morman handcart company at Florence, Nebraska, in June of that year and arriving at Salt Lake City in September. A gifted composer and musician, Beesley conducted the Mormon Tabernacle Choir 1880–1890, and he founded Beesley Music Company in 1903. At the time of his death in 1906, Beesley was survived by 11 of his 16 children, 40 grandchildren, and one great grandchild.

References

External links

Further reading
 "The Tabernacle Choir: Ebenezer Beesley," The Deseret Evening News, July 24, 1897, pp 12
 Peter L. Goss, Utah Historical Quarterly 43:3, Summer 1975, pp 209-239 (218-249)

		
National Register of Historic Places in Salt Lake City
Houses on the National Register of Historic Places in Utah
Adobe buildings and structures
Houses completed in the 19th century